Florin Vasile Bărdașu (born 23 September 1991) is a Romanian rugby union player. He plays in the hooker position for professional SuperLiga club Baia Mare and formerly for București based European Challenge Cup side the Wolves. He also plays for Romania's national team the Oaks.

References

External links

 
 
 
 

1991 births
Living people
Romanian rugby union players
Romania international rugby union players
CSM Știința Baia Mare players
Rugby union hookers
Place of birth missing (living people)